Gerard "Ged" Keegan (born 3 October 1955 in Bradford, West Riding of Yorkshire) is an English former footballer who played as a right-back. He joined Manchester City as a trainee in 1973 and made his debut in March 1975 in a 2–1 defeat against Carlisle United. He made a total of 37 Football League appearances for the club, scoring two goals. However his most memorable game for them was in their 1976 Football League Cup Final victory. He also played in the first ever England under-21 match. In 1978, he was transferred to Oldham Athletic where he made 144 League appearances (scoring 5 goals) before moving to Mansfield Town in 1983. After a short spell here he moved on to Rochdale, and then to Altrincham. As of 2008 he was working as a car-parking attendant at Manchester Airport.

References

English footballers
England under-21 international footballers
English Football League players
Manchester City F.C. players
Oldham Athletic A.F.C. players
Mansfield Town F.C. players
Rochdale A.F.C. players
Altrincham F.C. players
1955 births
Living people
Footballers from Bradford
Association football fullbacks